Sam D. Hentges (born July 18, 1996) is an American professional baseball pitcher for the Cleveland Guardians of Major League Baseball (MLB). He was drafted by the Cleveland Indians in the fourth round of the 2014 Major League Baseball draft. He made his MLB debut in 2021.

Amateur career
Hentges attended Mounds View High School in Arden Hills, Minnesota and as a senior in 2014, was the St. Paul Pioneer Press baseball player of the year. He committed to play college baseball at the University of Arkansas. He was drafted by the Cleveland Indians in the fourth round of the 2014 Major League Baseball draft.

Professional career
Hentges signed with the Indians, forgoing his commitment to Arkansas, and made his professional debut with the Arizona League Indians, compiling a 0.69 ERA in 13 innings.
 
Hentges pitched 2015 with the Arizona League Indians and Mahoning Valley Scrappers, pitching to a combined 3–5 record and 4.37 ERA in 13 total games (11 starts) between both teams. He started 2016 with the Lake County Captains, but had his season ended early after undergoing Tommy John surgery. He returned in 2017 and played with the Arizona League Indians and Mahoning Valley, going 0–4 with a 3.23 ERA in 11 starts. In 2018, Hentges played with the Lynchburg Hillcats where he was 6–6 with a 3.27 ERA in 23 starts.
 
The Indians added Hentges to their 40-man roster after the 2018 season. He began 2019 with the Akron RubberDucks. He did not play a minor league game in 2020 due to the cancellation of the minor league season caused by the COVID-19 pandemic.
 
On April 17, 2021, Hentges was promoted to the major leagues for the first time. He made his MLB debut on April 20, giving up one run in one inning pitched against the Chicago White Sox.

In 2022 he was 3-2 with a 2.32 ERA in 62.0 innings, with an 0.968 WHIP.

References

External links

1996 births
Living people
Akron RubberDucks players
Arizona League Indians players
Baseball players from Minnesota
Cleveland Indians players
Cleveland Guardians players
Lake County Captains players
Lynchburg Hillcats players
Mahoning Valley Scrappers players
Major League Baseball pitchers
People from Shoreview, Minnesota